Kim Yong-Se (Hangul: 김용세, Hanja: 金鏞世, born April 21, 1960) is a former South Korean football player.

Playing career 
After graduation of high school, he started his football career with amateur side Korea Electric Power. One year later, he went to ROK Army for military duty. From 1982 to 1988, he played in K-League side Yukong Elephants as a founding member. In 1989, he moved to Ilhwa Chunma as the first Free Agent in K-League.

International career 
He was a participant at 1979 FIFA World Youth Championship as a member of South Korea U-20 and 1986 FIFA World Cup and 1988 Summer Olympics as a member of South Korea.
Especially, he played as a defender in the 1986 FIFA World Cup.

Honours

Club
Yukong Elephants
 K-League
 Runner-up (1): 1984

Individual
K-League Best XI (3) : 1983, 1985, 1986
K-League Fighting Spirit Award (1) : 1985

References

External links
 
 FIFA Player Statistics
 

1960 births
Living people
Association football forwards
South Korean footballers
South Korea international footballers
Jeju United FC players
Seongnam FC players
K League 1 players
1986 FIFA World Cup players
Footballers at the 1988 Summer Olympics
Olympic footballers of South Korea
People from Paju
Asian Games medalists in football
Footballers at the 1986 Asian Games
Asian Games gold medalists for South Korea
Medalists at the 1986 Asian Games
Sportspeople from Gyeonggi Province